Andrew Watson may refer to:

Andrew Watson (bishop) (born 1961), Anglican Bishop of Guildford
Andrew Watson (British Army officer) (1927–2022), British general
Andrew Watson (cricketer) (born 1955), Australian cricketer
Andrew Watson (footballer, born 1856) (1856–1921), Scottish footballer for Queen's Park, national team
Andrew Watson (footballer, born 1894), Scottish footballer
Andrew Watson (footballer, born 1967), English footballer for Huddersfield Town, Exeter City, Mossley and Emley
Andrew Watson (racing driver) (born 1995), Northern Ireland racing driver
Andrew Lowe Watson (born 1958), English composer
Andrew Naismith Watson (born 1937), Canadian politician
Andy Watson (scientist) (born 1952), British marine and atmospheric scientist
 Andrew M. Watson, author of the 1974 theory of Arab Agricultural Revolution
 Andrew Watson, a character on Neighbours

See also 
Andrew Watson Myles (1884–1970), Canadian politician
Andrew Watson Armour III (1908–1991), of the meat-packing family
Andy Watson (disambiguation)